Major John Whitby "Johnnie" Cradock (17 May 1904 – 30 January 1987) was an English cook, writer and broadcaster and the fourth husband of television cook and writer Fanny Cradock.

Biography
Craddock was born in Lambeth, London, on 17 May 1904.

He attended Harrow School. At the age of twenty, he played rugby for Beckenham RFC during the 1924/5 season alongside a seventeen-year-old James Robertson Justice who would later become an actor.

On 26 June 1923, Cradock was commissioned from the Inns of Court Officers' Training Corps into the Territorial Army, as a second lieutenant in the 52nd (London) Anti-Aircraft Brigade, Royal Garrison Artillery. He was promoted to lieutenant on 26 June 1925, captain on 30 October 1930, and major on 30 October 1935. In 1943 he was awarded the Efficiency Decoration for twenty years' service. He remained on the Territorial Army Reserve of Officers until 27 November 1954.

He is best remembered as being the long-suffering stooge for his wife in their popular British cooking programmes which were shown from the 1950s to the 1970s. Wearing a traditional blazer and sporting a monocle, he would remain around the back of Fanny's studio sets awaiting her imperious commands which, when they came, often resulted in his being berated for being too slow.

With his wife, he wrote a number of popular cookery books. Johnnie and Fanny also wrote the "Bon Viveur" restaurant column for The Daily Telegraph newspaper from 1950 to 1955. This was one of Britain's first restaurant columns and led to their first television series in 1955.

At first they presented the BBC's Kitchen Magic, but were soon poached by ITV's first cooking programme, which they presented as Fanny & Johnnie.

At that time Johnnie and Fanny were not married. Fanny adopted his name for their writing and television work and they eventually married in 1977. The marriage was in fact bigamous as Fanny was still married to her second husband, and she had lied about her age on the marriage certificate.

He died, in Basingstoke, Hampshire, on 30 January 1987).

Television filmography

Chez Bon Viveur
Cradock Cooks for Christmas
Dinner Party
Fanny Cradock Invites
Fanny's Kitchen
The Cradocks

Publications (with Fanny Cradock) 
 Something's Burning: The Autobiography of Two Cooks (1960)
 The Daily Telegraph Cook's Book by Bon Viveur (1964) 
 Fanny & Johnnie Cradock's Cook Hostess' Book (1970) 
 Fanny & Johnnie Cradock's Freezer Book (1978) 
 Fanny & Johnnie's Cook's Essential Alphabet (1979)

Media portrayals
Johnnie Cradock's style of dress, his love of wine, and the on-screen "hen-pecked" relationship he shared with Fanny were all ripe for mimicry. Both Fanny and Johnnie were parodied by The Two Ronnies and on The Benny Hill Show, with Bob Todd as an invariably drunk Johnnie serving as a foil to Hill's portrayal of Fanny.

Fear of Fanny, a television drama on the career of the Cradocks, based on the stage show by Brian Fillis was broadcast in October 2006 on BBC Four as one of a series of culinary-themed dramas. Johnnie Cradock was portrayed by Mark Gatiss.

References

1904 births
1987 deaths
English food writers
English television chefs
People educated at Harrow School
People from Lambeth
Royal Artillery officers
The Daily Telegraph people
English columnists
20th-century English businesspeople